Eugen Woldemar Bostroem (13 October 1850 – 24 May 1928) was a Baltic German pathologist. He was born in Fellin (today known as Viljandi), in the Livonian Governorate of the Russian Empire (present-day Estonia).

He studied medicine at the universities of Leipzig and Erlangen, receiving his degree in 1876. Afterwards he was an assistant to Friedrich Albert von Zenker (1825–1898) at the pathology institute in Erlangen. From 1883 to 1926 he was a professor of general pathology and pathological anatomy in Gießen.

In 1890 Bostroem reportedly isolated the causative organism of actinomycosis from a culture of grain, grasses, and soil. After Bostroem's discovery there was a general misconception that actinomycosis was a mycosis that affected individuals who chewed grass or straw.  The agents of actinomycosis are now known to be endogenous organisms of the mucous membranes, in most cases Actinomyces israelii, a species named after surgeon James Israel, who first discovered its presence in humans in the late 1870s.

In 1883 Bostroem was the first to describe a rare condition known as splenogonadal fusion. Since his discovery, approximately only 150 cases have been documented.

See also
 List of Baltic German scientists

Selected writings 
 Beiträge zur pathologischen Anatomie der Nieren (Contributions to the pathological anatomy of the kidneys), Freiburg i.B. and Tübingen, 1884.
 Traumaticismus und Parasitismus als ursachen
 Untersuchungen über die Aktinomykose des Menschen (Investigations on actinomycosis in humans), 1891.

References 
 ISBN Recherche (biographical information)
  Mandell, Bennett, & Dolin: Principles and Practice of Infectious Diseases
 Article on Cervicofacial actinomycosis
 NCBI Splenogonadal fusion: case presentation and literature review

1850 births
1928 deaths
People from Viljandi
People from Kreis Fellin
Baltic-German people
Emigrants from the Russian Empire to Germany
German pathologists
Academic staff of the University of Giessen